An Eyewitness Account (also known as Risking Witness and Witness in Danger) is a 1997 thriller-drama film directed by Pasquale Pozzessere. It is based on real life events of Sicilian Mafia hit eyewitness Piero Nava. For his performance Fabrizio Bentivoglio won the David di Donatello Award for best actor and the Ciak d'oro in the same category.

Cast 
Fabrizio Bentivoglio as Pietro Nava 
Claudio Amendola as  Sandro Nardella
Margherita Buy as  Franca Nava
Pierfrancesco Pergoli as  Luca Nava 
Maurizio Donadoni as Vincenzo Turrini 
Arnaldo Ninchi as  Cataldi
Sara Franchetti as  Franca's Mother
Biagio Pelligra as  Police Commissioner  De Lio

Reception
The film opened in Italy on 26 screens and grossed $107,929 for the weekend, placing 14th at the box office.

References

External links

1997 films
Italian thriller drama films
1990s thriller drama films
Drama films based on actual events
Italian neo-noir films
1997 drama films
1990s Italian-language films
1990s Italian films